The Little Gypsy Witch is a 2011 Croatian children's fantasy film which is directed by Tomislav Žaja.

Cast
 Sabina Ajrula as Baba Ilonka
 Selma Ibrahimi as Manuša
 Marin Arman Grbin as Zdenko
 Aleksandra Balmazović as Aska
 Rakan Rushaidat as Hrast
 Krunoslav Sarić as Kasum

References

External links
 

2011 films
2010s children's fantasy films
Croatian children's films
2010s Croatian-language films
2011 directorial debut films